The 2022–23 Gonzaga Bulldogs men's basketball team represents Gonzaga University, located in Spokane, Washington, in the 2022–23 NCAA Division I men's basketball season. The team, also unofficially nicknamed the "Zags", is led by head coach Mark Few, in his 24th season as head coach, and played home games at the on-campus McCarthey Athletic Center as members of the West Coast Conference (WCC). The Zags finished the regular season 26–5, 14–2 in WCC play to win a share of the regular season championship. 

On January 19, 2023, the Zags lost to Loyola Marymount, ending their 76-game home winning streak.

Previous season 

The Bulldogs finished the 2021–22 season 28–4, 13–1 in WCC Play to win the regular season championship. They defeated San Francisco and Saint Mary's in the WCC tournament to win the tournament championship. As a result, they received the conference's automatic bid to the NCAA tournament as the No. 1 seed in the West region. They were named the overall No. 1 seed for the second consecutive tournament. The Bulldogs defeated Georgia State and Memphis to advance to the Sweet Sixteen. In the Sweet Sixteen, they lost to Arkansas.

Offseason

Departures 
Due to COVID-19, the NCAA ruled in October 2020 that the 2020–21 season would not count against the eligibility of any basketball player, thus giving all players the option to return in 2021–22.

Outgoing transfers

Incoming transfers

Recruiting classes

2022 recruiting class

2023 recruiting class

Personnel

Roster 
Note: Players' year is based on remaining eligibility. The NCAA did not count the 2020–21 season towards eligibility.
 Roster is subject to change as/if players transfer or leave the program for other reasons.

Source:

Schedule and results 

|-
!colspan=12 style=| Exhibition

|-
!colspan=12 style=|Regular season

|-

|-
!colspan=12 style=| WCC Tournament

|-
!colspan=12 style=| NCAA Tournament

Source

Rankings

See also 
2022–23 Gonzaga Bulldogs women's basketball team

References 

Gonzaga Bulldogs men's basketball seasons
Gonzaga
2022 in sports in Washington (state)
2023 in sports in Washington (state)
Gonzaga